Brendan Richard O'Callaghan (born 23 July 1955) is a former professional footballer who played in the Football League for Doncaster Rovers and Stoke City and Oldham Athletic. Born in England, he made six appearances for the Republic of Ireland national team.

Career
Born in Bradford to Irish parents, O'Callaghan was spotted by Doncaster Rovers playing for Bradford Boys and Yorkshire schools. But the offer to become a professional footballer was a tough decision to make for O'Callaghan as he had been accepted into Loughborough College to undertake a physical education teaching diploma. He signed the contract, deferring college for a year in case the football did not work out. After six months in Donny's reserves he was promoted to the first team and he developed a fine partnership with Peter Kitchen and he top scored in 1975–76 with 28 goals. By the time his goal tally had reached 77 for Doncaster he had attracted the attentions of bigger clubs and on 1 March 1978 Stoke City manager Alan Durban signed him for £40,000.

The following Wednesday O'Callaghan was on the bench as Stoke struggled to break down a resolute Hull City and with time running out and Stoke winning a corner Durban decided to bring O'Callaghan on for his début. From the resulting corner he headed past Eddie Blackburn to make him an instant hero (fastest debut goal). He ended the 1977–78 season with six goals and was top-scorer in 1978–79 with 16 as Stoke won promotion to the First Division. With Stoke making a slow start in 1980–81 Durban moved O'Callaghan, who had lost his place to the younger Lee Chapman, to centre back filling in for the injured Denis Smith. He adapted well and his partnership with Mike Doyle saw Stoke in to a final mid-table position of 11th. He began the 1981–82 season in defence before reverting to forward in January 1982 where he scored five goals and he again scored five in 1982–83. He struggled under Richie Barker's long ball tactics in 1983–84 and he handed in a transfer request but Barker was sacked and replaced by Bill Asprey and so O'Callaghan stayed at Stoke. Under Asprey Stoke staged a relegation survival but in 1984–85 Stoke were awful and well on their way to an embarrassing relegation so O'Callaghan moved on to Oldham Athletic for £30,000 after making 294 appearances for Stoke scoring 47 goals. In the first match of the 1985–86 he suffered an adductor muscle strain which caused him to retire on the advice of doctors.

Post-retirement
After leaving Oldham O'Callaghan took a degree in business administration at the University of Dublin. Having been Stoke's Professional Footballers' Association representative, he worked in 1989 as a community development officer at the Victoria Ground. He later became north-west Midlands area manager for Save the Children charity.

Style of play

Career statistics

Club

International

See also
 List of Republic of Ireland international footballers born outside the Republic of Ireland

References

External links
 Profile from Doncaster Rovers site

1955 births
Living people
Footballers from Bradford
English footballers
Republic of Ireland association footballers
Republic of Ireland international footballers
Association football forwards
Doncaster Rovers F.C. players
Stoke City F.C. players
Oldham Athletic A.F.C. players
English Football League players
English people of Irish descent